Antonio Sabàto Jr. (born February 29, 1972) is an Italian-born American model and actor. Sabàto first found fame in the 1990s as an underwear model for Calvin Klein and playing Jagger Cates on the soap opera General Hospital from 1992 to 1995. By the early 2000s, most of his acting credits were guest appearances, reality television, and budget films. Sabàto ran unsuccessfully as the Republican candidate for U.S. Congress against incumbent Democratic Congresswoman Julia Brownley for California's 26th district in the 2018 elections.

Early life
Sabàto was born in Rome, Italy on February 29, 1972, a Leap Day. His father was Antonio Sabàto Sr., an Italian-born film star. His mother, Yvonne, was born in Prague (then part of Czechoslovakia), and of half Czech and half Jewish ancestry; her own mother was a Jewish Holocaust survivor. He has one sibling, a sister named Simonne. Sabàto and his family moved to the United States from Italy in 1985 and he became a naturalized citizen of the United States in 1996. He received his high school diploma from Palisades Charter High School in Los Angeles, California. His parents divorced, and his mother remarried, to California-based businessman George F. Kabouchy, in 1997.

Career

Modeling
Sabàto was featured on the cover of erotic magazine Playgirl in April 1993. Represented in Los Angeles by fashion agent Omar Albertto, Sabàto first gained attention as a Calvin Klein underwear model in 1996. In 1990, he appeared in Janet Jackson's "Love Will Never Do (Without You)" music video along with actor Djimon Hounsou, who is also a former CK underwear model represented by Albertto. In 2013, Sabàto was named the international celebrity spokesperson for AnastasiaDate, an online mail-order bride website which connects wealthy American older men with Eastern European women.

Acting
Moving into acting, from 1992 through 1995 he appeared on the soap opera General Hospital, the science fiction series Earth 2 and the prime time soap opera Melrose Place. Throughout the late 1990s, he starred in various TV movies and direct-to-video films, as well as a supporting role in the 1998 feature film The Big Hit. In 2003, he played the protagonist's lover Pablo in the movie Testosterone, filmed in Argentina with Sonia Braga, David Sutcliffe, Jennifer Coolidge, Celina Font and Leonardo Brezicki. From 2005 to 2006, Sabàto played Dante Damiano on the daytime soap opera The Bold and the Beautiful, and in 2008, Sabàto reprised his role as Jagger Cates on the second season of General Hospital: Night Shift. Sabàto made an appearance on Bones as a bouncer from a Jersey Shore club in season 6, episode 3, "The Maggots in the Meathead" in 2010. In 2013, he played Father Zaragosa in the television series The League. Sabàto is set to direct, produce and star in an upcoming project called Trail Blazers, which reportedly is the first in the line of other films he hopes to produce for his upcoming film studio called Trail Blazers Pictures. The film costars fellow Donald Trump supporters Kristy Swanson, Kevin Sorbo, Dean Cain, and Scott Baio.

Dancing
In 2016, Sabàto was contracted to be a Chippendales dancer for a special engagement in June at the Rio All Suite Hotel and Casino in Las Vegas.

Reality television
In 2005, Sabàto appeared on But Can They Sing?, a celebrity reality singing competition on VH1, coming in 5th place. He competed in the 2008 NBC competition Celebrity Circus, which he won. He stated on the show that both his mother and her father were circus performers.

In August 2009, Sabàto starred in My Antonio, a reality show on VH1 in which female contestants competed to win his heart. The show notably featured Sabàto's ex-wife, Tully Jensen, as one of the contestants (she came in 3rd place), and his mother also appeared on the show, providing advice. The show's winner was Brooke Barlow.

Sabàto and his family appeared on ABC's Celebrity Wife Swap on January 31, 2012. His then-fiancé Cheryl Moana Marie Nunes traded places on the show with WWE wrestler Mick Foley's wife Colette Foley. Sabàto competed on season 19 of Dancing with the Stars in 2014. He was paired with professional dancer Cheryl Burke, and they finished in 8th place.

Hosting 
Since 2014, Sabàto has served as the host of a 30-minute long syndicated home remodeling show Fix It & Finish It.

Producing 
Sabàto announced that he wants to start a Hollywood movie studio geared toward conservative content. The new company is called  and the studio's first upcoming film, Trail Blazers, is in the works for a release in 2022.

Politics

Sabàto ran for the 26th district Congressional seat in California as a Republican against incumbent Democrat Julia Brownley. He came in second place in the jungle primary with 22.4% of the vote, advancing to face Brownley in the general election. He lost the election on November 6, 2018, by 24%.

Regarding illegal immigration, Sabàto said, "There should be no shortcuts for those who don't want to pay or wait". He supported Trump's wall on the southern border, saying, "We need a wall."

Sabàto has made many controversial statements regarding former U.S. President Barack Obama, including saying he has "no guts," accusing him of destroying the U.S. economy, and asserting that Obama should be arrested and sent to the Guantanamo Bay detention camp. The former Democrat has also implied that Obama is the reason he left the Democratic Party.

For several years, Sabàto has maintained that, in his opinion, Obama is not a Christian but a Muslim. The first instance of such a claim came in 2016, when Sabàto, after making a speech at the Republican National Convention, told ABC News "I don't believe he follows the God that I love and the Jesus that I love," and "If you follow his story, if you read his book, if you understand about Obama, I mean, that's not a Christian name, is it?" When pressed for evidence to back up his claims, Sabàto answered that it's "in his heart."

Two years later, in 2018, he reaffirmed his belief that Obama is a Muslim when appearing on The View, saying "If he's [Obama's] not a Muslim, we should call him President Barry," and claimed that "What I was saying was, he changed his name to Obama because he followed the Islam religion when he was growing up so, I felt that once you're in that religion, you stay for the rest of your life."

Sabàto endorsed Donald Trump for president in 2016. He spoke at the 2016 Republican National Convention in support of the party's presumptive nominee. Sabàto claimed that after he expressed his support for Trump, he was blacklisted from Hollywood. He later compared his struggle to find work in show business with that of being Jewish during the Holocaust and said celebrities mocked him on the social media website Twitter.

Personal life
Sabàto was married to Tully Jensen from 1992 until 1993. He married Cheryl Moana Marie Nunes in 2012. The two separated in December 2016 and their divorce was finalized in June 2018. After Sabàto filed for divorce, Nunes alleged that Sabàto was abusing prescription drugs and had failed to complete even one month of a three-month-long drug rehabilitation program. Sabàto said that he was addicted to prescription sleep aids, not benzodiazepines as Nunes claimed, but admitted that he had a problem with substance abuse in the past, specifically crystal meth. Sabàto has three children: a son with Virginia Madsen, a daughter with Kristin Rossetti Biasi, and a son with Nunes.

Sabàto is a Christian but has, on several occasions, said that he also identifies as being Jewish.

Sabàto had testosterone pellets injected into his buttocks as a treatment for low levels of testosterone. Sabàto has several tattoos, including the Batman logo on his lower back and the yin yang symbol surrounded by Chinese characters on his arm.

In a December 2018 tweet, Sabàto stated that he and his family were in the process of moving out of California to an undisclosed state, citing his frustration with the state's progressive policies as the primary reason. In March 2020, Sabàto moved to Florida, and now works for a construction company.

Filmography

See also
 List of male underwear models

References

External links

 
 
 SoapCentral.com: Sabato profile
 

1972 births
Living people
20th-century American Jews
20th-century American male actors
20th-century Italian Jews
20th-century Italian male actors
21st-century American Jews
21st-century American male actors
21st-century American politicians
21st-century Italian Jews
21st-century Italian male actors
21st-century Italian politicians
American actor-politicians
American Christians
American male judoka
American male models
American male soap opera actors
American male television actors
American people of Czech descent
American people of Czech-Jewish descent
American people of Italian descent
American practitioners of Brazilian jiu-jitsu
California Republicans
Candidates in the 2018 United States elections
Florida Republicans
Italian Christians
Italian emigrants to the United States
Italian expatriates in the United States
Italian male judoka
Italian male models
Italian male television actors
Italian people of Czech descent
Italian people of Jewish descent
Italian practitioners of Brazilian jiu-jitsu
Male actors from California
Male actors from Rome
Male models from California
Models from Rome
Participants in American reality television series
People with acquired American citizenship
Politicians from Rome